Carl Recchia (born 13 December 1984) is an Australian footballer.

Biography
Recchia played as a central midfielder for the Melbourne Victory in the inaugural season of the Hyundai A-League. He was let go at the end of the season, and returned to the Victorian Premier League with Fawkner Blues. On 20 October 2006 it was announced that he was to join Queensland Roar FC on a short-term contract. Recchia returned again to the Victorian Premier League to captain Altona Magic to their Back-to-Back championship win in 2009 before returning to his first club South Melbourne FC to play for them in the 2010 and 2011 VPL seasons.

References

1984 births
Living people
A-League Men players
Australian people of Italian descent
Association football midfielders
Australian soccer players
South Melbourne FC players
Melbourne Victory FC players
Brisbane Roar FC players
Soccer players from Melbourne